The Somers-class destroyer''' was a class of five 1850-ton United States Navy destroyers based on the . They were answers to the large destroyers that the Japanese navy was building at the time, and were initially intended to be flotilla leaders. They were laid down from 1935–1936 and commissioned from 1937–1939. They were built to round-out the thirteen destroyers of 1,850 tons standard displacement allowed by the tonnage limits of the London Naval Treaty, and were originally intended to be repeat Porters. However, new high-pressure, high-temperature boilers became available, allowing the use of a single stack. This combined with weight savings (including elimination of reload torpedoes) allowed an increase from two quadruple center-line torpedo tube mounts to three. However, the Somers class were still over-weight and top-heavy.

Like the Porters, they were originally built with eight /38 caliber guns in four single-purpose (surface action only) twin mounts.  Anti-aircraft (AA) protection was initially provided by two quadruple  machine cannon mounts and two .50-caliber machine guns.  The 1.1-inch mounts were intended to compensate for the 5-inch guns' lack of AA capability; in the 1930s this was thought to be sufficient. As with the Porters, the Somers main armament was reduced to six guns (and replaced with dual-purpose mounts totaling five guns in Davis and Jouett) during World War II, with the anti-aircraft armament replaced by 40 mm Bofors and 20 mm Oerlikon guns and the torpedo armament reduced to eight tubes. In two ships (Davis and Jouett) the torpedo armament was eliminated to maximize the number of 40 mm guns.

All of the class served in World War II, initially on Neutrality Patrols in the Atlantic and Caribbean. In early 1942 Warrington and Sampson were transferred to the Southeast Pacific Area, where they primarily escorted convoys between the Panama Canal and the Society Islands. In mid-1943 these two were transferred to the Southwest Pacific Area and operated near New Guinea and in the Solomon Islands; the others operated off Brazil and in the Caribbean and South Atlantic. In May 1944 all were transferred to the North Atlantic to support the invasion of Normandy, which Somers, Davis, and Jouett were directly involved in. Somers and Jouett supported the invasion of southern France in August. Warrington foundered in a hurricane in the Bahamas in September 1944.  The others escorted convoys for the remainder of the war, and were scrapped by 1947.

Design
The five Somers class were built to round out the eight Porter-class 1850-ton destroyers to the London Naval Treaty tonnage limit of thirteen such ships, and were originally intended to be repeat Porters. However, controversial (for the time) high-pressure, high-temperature air-encased boilers derived from the ones installed in the modernized battleship  became available, and the class was built to a modified design by Gibbs & Cox. The new boilers allowed the use of a single stack. This combined with weight savings (including elimination of reload torpedoes) allowed an increase from two quadruple centerline torpedo tube mounts to three (versus the Porters). However, the Somers class were still over-weight and top-heavy. The resulting broadside of twelve torpedo tubes was the heaviest ever on a US destroyer; other classes (and ) with sixteen torpedo tubes had an eight-tube broadside. Gun armament remained the same as the Porters, with eight 5-inch/38 caliber single purpose (anti-surface only) guns in four twin mounts. Two quadruple 1.1-inch machine cannon mounts were added to compensate for the lack of main battery anti-aircraft capability.

Engineering
The Somers-class propulsion plant was the most advanced yet installed in a US Navy destroyer. Boiler economizers were included for improved fuel efficiency. The main steam turbines were impulse-type (also called Curtis turbines) and included cruising turbines and double-reduction gearing.

Armament

Like the Porters, the Somers class were originally built with eight Mark 12 5-inch/38 caliber guns in four Mark 22 single purpose (anti-surface only) twin mounts. Torpedo armament was increased to twelve  tubes in three quad mountings on the centerline, but with no reloads. The Mark 15 torpedo was equipped. Anti-aircraft (AA) protection was initially provided by two quadruple 1.1-inch machine cannon mounts and two .50-caliber machine guns. The 1.1-inch mounts were intended to compensate for the 5 inch guns' lack of AA capability; in the 1930s two quad mounts were thought to be sufficient. During World War II, as with the Porters, the Somers-class main armament was reduced to six guns, with the light AA armament replaced by up to six 40 mm Bofors in twin mounts and several 20 mm Oerlikon guns by also landing a torpedo tube mount. On most ships four K-gun depth charge throwers were added to augment the as-built pair of depth charge racks. In Davis and Jouett the main armament was replaced by five dual-purpose guns in two twin and one single mount. Later in these two, the torpedo armament was eliminated along with two K-guns and one depth charge rack to maximize the number of 40 mm guns at 14, placed in two quad mounts and three twin mounts.

Service
In 1941, all of the class were based in the Atlantic or Caribbean conducting Neutrality Patrols, during which Somers and the cruiser  captured a German blockade runner, earning the last prize money ever awarded by the US Navy. In early 1942 Warrington and Sampson moved to the Southeast Pacific Area, escorting convoys from the Panama Canal to the Society Islands, along with patrols to ports in South America. These two transferred to the Southwest Pacific Area in mid-1943, with operations including the start of the Bougainville Campaign, a raid on New Ireland, and actions near New Guinea. Somers, Davis, and Jouett spent the first years of the war patrolling the Caribbean and South Atlantic, intercepting several German blockade runners and at least one U-boat near Brazil.

In May 1944 all of the class were transferred to the North Atlantic as part of the buildup for the invasion of Normandy, which Somers, Davis, and Jouett directly supported. Although Davis struck a mine and returned to the US for repairs, Somers and Jouett also supported the invasion of southern France in August, in which Somers sank two German vessels and engaged shore batteries. Warrington'' foundered in a hurricane near the Bahamas in September. The remainder of the class spent the rest of the war escorting convoys in the Atlantic and Mediterranean. Following the war, all were scrapped by 1947.

Ships in class

See also

References

Citations

Sources

External links
Somers-class destroyers at Destroyer History Foundation
Tin Can Sailors @ Destroyers.org – Somers class destroyer article
Tin Can Sailors @ Destroyers.org – Somers class destroyer specs
USS Somers and USS Warrington General Information Book with as-built data at Destroyer History Foundation
 "Goldplater" destroyers at Destroyer History Foundation
 1850-ton leader classes at Destroyer History Foundation
 NavSource Destroyer Photo Index Page

Destroyer classes